is a 2012 Japanese anime drama film directed and co-written by Mamoru Hosoda. The second original feature film directed by Hosoda and the first work written by him, the film stars the voices of Aoi Miyazaki, Takao Osawa and Haru Kuroki. The story's central theme is "parent and child", depicting 13 years in the life of a young woman, Hana, who falls in love with a werewolf while in college, and following his death must raise the resulting half-wolf half-human siblings, Ame and Yuki, who grow and find their own paths in life.

Hosoda established Studio Chizu for production. Yoshiyuki Sadamoto, of Nadia: The Secret of Blue Water (1990) and Neon Genesis Evangelion (1995), designed the characters. Wolf Children had its world premiere in Paris on June 25, 2012, and was released theatrically on July 21, 2012, in Japan. Funimation licenses the film for North America and Manga Entertainment handles UK rights.

Plot

In Tokyo, college student Hana falls in "fairy tale" love with an enigmatic man. The man reveals that he can transform into a wolf, and they later have two wolf/human children: A daughter named Yuki, and a son named Ame. Soon after, their father is killed in an accident while hunting food for the children.

Hana's life as a single mother is difficult; Yuki and Ame constantly switch between their human and wolf forms, get into fights, and Hana has to hide them from the world. After she receives noise complaints and a visit from social workers concerned that the children have not had vaccinations, Hana moves the family to the countryside away from prying neighbors. She works hard to repair a dilapidated house, but struggles to sustain the family on their own crops. With help from a strict old man named Nirasaki, she learns to farm sufficiently and becomes friends with some of the locals.

One winter day, Ame almost drowns in a river after trying to hunt a kingfisher, but Yuki rescues him, and Ame becomes more confident in his wolf abilities. Yuki begs her mother to let her go to school like other children. Hana accepts on the condition that Yuki keeps her wolf nature secret. Yuki soon makes friends at school. Meanwhile, Ame is more interested in the forest and takes lessons from an elderly fox about survival in the wild.

In fourth grade, Yuki's class receives a new transfer student, Sōhei, who realizes something is strange about her. When he pursues the matter by cornering her, Yuki gets angry, transforms into a wolf, and inadvertently injures him, leaving a scar on his right ear. At the meeting with their parents and teachers, Sōhei tells them a wolf attacked him, absolving Yuki of the blame. The two become friends.

Yuki and Ame fight over whether they are human or wolf, especially after Yuki tries to force Ame to start going back to school, which he refuses to do. Two years later, a fierce storm gathers and Yuki's school is let out early. As Hana is about to leave to pick her up, Ame disappears into the forest to help his dying fox teacher, so she follows him. The other children are picked up by their parents, leaving Yuki and Sōhei alone. Yuki shows Sōhei that she can transform into a wolf and it was really her who attacked him. He tells her he already knew, and promises to keep her secret.

As Hana searches for Ame, she slips and falls off a cliff. She sees a vision of the children's father, who tells her that Yuki and Ame will find their own paths in life, and that she raised them well. Ame finds Hana and carries her to safety. She awakens to see Ame fully transform into an adult wolf and run into the mountains. Realizing he has found his own path, she happily but tearfully accepts his goodbye.

One year later, Yuki leaves home to move into a middle school dormitory. Ame's wolf howls are heard far and wide in the forest. Hana, now living alone, reflects that raising her wolf children was like a fairy tale, and feels proud to have raised them well.

Voice cast

Production
One of Hosoda's motivations for working on this film was that people around him had started raising children, and he "saw them shining as they became parents." In an interview with Anime! Anime! in February 2013, Hosoda explained why he chose the setting of Wolf Children despite the fact that it is a story about raising a child: "It is generally taken for granted that children are raised and then grow up. But for the actual people involved, it is not natural at all. In order for the audience to share this feeling, I thought it would be good if we all shared an experience that no one else had (raising a werewolf child)."

In an interview with Famitsu, Hosoda said, "I used to take it for granted that people would have children. However, after getting married, I began to realize that raising children in the city is a hardship in terms of the environment, such as public support, and that living in the countryside is not necessarily easy, and that there is a hardship of not having anyone of the same age. I wanted to make a film about such endurance." Human parenting cannot be done in complete isolation, and the reason for choosing wolves as the material for the project was that "wolves are very family-oriented, and they are disciplined animals that have a leader who leads the pack and lives with the whole group in mind."

The setting of the early part of the story, "a national university on the outskirts of Tokyo," is modeled after Hitotsubashi University in Kunitachi, Tokyo. In addition, the countryside where Hana moves to is modeled after the undeveloped woodland in Toyama Prefecture. The backdrop of the film depicts the landscape of Nakaniikawa District's Kamiichi, Hosoda's hometown, and the neighboring town of Tateyama, and it was divulged that the former mayor of Kamiichi, Naoshi Itō, approached Hosoda to "make a film based on the town." The old house that served as the model for Hana's house was a private home owned by Masao Yamazaki, who lived in Kamiichi. In 2007, five years before the movie was released, Yamazaki passed away, and the house was considered for demolition, but it was chosen as the model for Hana's house, and after the movie became a big hit, it was opened to the public by the owners (relatives of Yamazaki) and volunteers (as of 2015). The elementary school that Ame and Yuki attended was modeled after Tanaka Elementary School (only the gymnasium is still in existence). The yakitori with sauce that appears in the film is oidare yakitori, a local dish from Ueda, Nagano, where Hosoda's wife's parents live.

Release
At a press conference held on June 18, 2012, the director Mamoru Hosoda announced that Wolf Children would be released in 34 countries and territories. This film's premiere was in France on June 25, 2012, marking its international debut.

It was subsequently released in Japan on July 21, 2012. The film's Blu-ray and DVD release date for Japan was February 20, 2013. The film had a limited release in the United States on September 27, 2013.

Wolf Children was screened at Animefest 2013 in May in the Czech Republic and at Animafest Zagreb 2013 in June in Croatia.

Other media
In addition to the film, two novelizations and a manga written by Hosoda (with art by ) were released by Kadokawa Shoten. The manga was translated into English by Yen Press and was nominated for the "Best U.S. Edition of International Material—Asia" category at the 2015 Eisner Awards. As tie-ins to the film, a film picture book, an art book, and a storyboard book were released from Kadokawa, Media Pal, and Pia.
Mamoru Hosoda Pia, Pia, July 10, 2012, 
Wolf Children Ame and Yuki by Mamoru Hosoda, Kadokawa Tsubasa Bunko, July 15, 2012, 
Kadokawa Picture Book Wolf Children Ame and Yuki by Mamoru Hosoda, Kadokawa Shoten, July 15, 2012, 
Wolf Children Ame and Yuki Storyboards Animestyle Archive by Mamoru Hosoda, Media Pal, July 21, 2012, 
Wolf Children Ame and Yuki Official Book: Hana no Yō ni edited by the Wolf Children Ame and Yuki Production Committee, Kadokawa Shoten, July 23, 2012, 
Wolf Children Ame and Yuki Artbook edited by the Wolf Children Ame and Yuki Production Committee, Kadokawa Shoten, August 25, 2012,

Reception

Box office
Wolf Children was the second-highest-grossing film in Japan on its debut weekend of July 21–22, 2012, beating Pixar's animation Brave, which debuted in Japan on the same weekend. It attracted an audience of 276,326 throughout the weekend, grossing 365.14 million yen. The film subsequently surpassed Hosoda's previous work Summer Wars''' gross of around 1.6 billion yen during the weekend of August 12–13, 2012. In total, Wolf Children grossed 4.2 billion yen, making it the fifth-highest-grossing movie in Japan in 2012.

Critical reception
The review aggregator website Rotten Tomatoes reports that 95% of critics have given the film a positive review based on 19 reviews, with an average rating of 8.5/10. On Metacritic, the film has an weighted average score of 71 out of 100 based on 5 critics, signifying "generally favorable reviews."

Mark Schilling of The Japan Times gave the film three out of five stars and wrote that "The Miyazaki influence on Hosoda's own work seems obvious, from his cute-but-realistic style to his concern with pressing social issues and the messy emotions of actual human beings". He felt the film was "on the conventional and predictable side ... appealing to Jane Eyre fans in one scene, Call of the Wild fans in the next" and criticized its "well-worn, stereotypical rails".

Thomas Sotinel of Le Monde gave the film five out of five stars. Dave Chua of Mypaper also praised the film's "magnificent understated eye for detail, from the grain of wood on doors to the lovingly captured forest scenes, that help lift the movie above regular animation fare." Chris Michael of The Guardian gave the film four out of five, writing that "telling the story through the eyes of the harried, bereaved but indomitable mother gives this calm, funny, only occasionally schmaltzy family film a maturity Twilight never reached." Kenneth Turan of the Los Angeles Times described it as "an odd story, told in a one-of-a-kind style that feels equal parts sentimental, somber and strange," and felt the English language performances were inappropriately sweet and simplistic. Steven D. Greydanus, writing in the National Catholic Register, named the film a runner-up in its list of the best films of 2013, writing: "Despite brief early problematic content and an ambiguous climactic letdown, the main story is magic."

AwardsWolf Children won the 2013 Japan Academy Prize for Animation of the Year, the 2012 Mainichi Film Award for Best Animation Film, and the 2013 Animation of the Year award at TAF. It won two awards at the Oslo Films from the South festival in Norway: the main award, the Silver Mirror, and the audience award. It won an Audience Award at 2013 New York International Children's Film Festival and the 2014 Best Anime Disc award from Home Media Magazine''.

References

External links
 
 Official website 

 2012 review
 BD review

 
English Dubbed Trailer For Manga Entertainment UK release on December 23, 2013

2012 anime films
Anime with original screenplays
Films about families
Films about siblings
Films adapted into comics
Films directed by Mamoru Hosoda
Nippon TV films
Funimation
Japan Academy Prize for Animation of the Year winners
Japanese animated fantasy films
Films with screenplays by Satoko Okudera
Toho animated films
Werewolves in animated film
Films scored by Masakatsu Takagi
Films set in Toyama Prefecture
Paranormal romance films
Anime and manga about werewolves